Helena Modrzejewska (born Jadwiga Benda; 12 October 1840 – 8 April 1909), known professionally as Helena Modjeska, was a Polish actress who specialized in Shakespearean and tragic roles. She was successful first on the Polish stage. After emigrating to the United States (and despite her poor command of English), she also succeeded on stage in America and London. She is regarded as the greatest actress in the history of theatre in Poland.

Early life
Helena Modjeska was born in Kraków, Poland, on 12 October 1840. Her birth name was recorded as Jadwiga Benda, but she was later baptized Helena Opid, under her godfather's surname.

Modjeska's parentage is unclear. Her mother was Józefa (Misel) Benda, the widow of a prosperous Kraków merchant, Szymon Benda. In her autobiography, Modjeska claimed that her father was a musician named Michael Opid. The Benda family did employ a music teacher named Michal Opid, who later stood as Helena's godfather, however Opid did not father Józefa Benda's two youngest children.

There is evidence to suggest that Helena and her older brother Adolf were the results of an affair between Józefa and Prince Władysław Hieronim Sanguszko, a wealthy and influential Polish nobleman.  Helena also had a younger sister, Josephine, and several half-brothers from Józefa's first marriage. Helena and Josephine were primarily raised by their great-aunt Teresa.

Also glossed over in Modjeska's autobiography were the details concerning her first marriage, to her former guardian, Gustave Sinnmayer (Polish: Gustaw Zimajer). Gustave was an actor and the director of a second-rate provincial theater troupe. The date of Modjeska's marriage to Gustave is uncertain. She discovered many years later that they had not been legally married, because he was still married to his first wife when they wed. Together the couple had two children, a son Rudolf (later renamed Ralph Modjeski), and a daughter Marylka, who died in infancy.

Gustaw Zimajer used the stage name "Gustaw Modrzejewski." It was the feminine form of this name that Modjeska adopted when she made her stage debut in 1861 as Helena Modrzejewska. Later, when acting abroad, she simplified  her name to "Modjeska", which was easier for English-speaking audiences to pronounce.

In her early Polish acting career, Modrzejewska played at Bochnia, Nowy Sącz, Przemyśl, Rzeszów and Brzeżany. In 1862 she appeared for the first time in Lwów, playing in her first Romantic drama, as "Skierka" in Juliusz Słowacki's Balladyna. From 1863 she appeared at Stanisławów and Czerniowce, in plays by Słowacki.

In 1865 Zimajer tried to get her a contract with Viennese theaters, but the plan came to naught due to her poor knowledge of the German language. Later that year Helena left Zimajer, taking their son Rudolf, and returning to Kraków. Once there she accepted a four-year theatrical engagement. In 1868 she began appearing in Warsaw; during her eight years there, she consolidated her status as a theater star. Her half-brothers Józef and Feliks Benda were also well-regarded actors in Poland.

One incident illustrates the restrictions of nineteenth century Polish society. At one of Modrzejewska's Warsaw performances, seventeen secondary-school pupils presented her with a bouquet of flowers tied with a ribbon in the red-and-white Polish national colors. The pupils were accused by the Russian Imperial authorities of conducting a patriotic demonstration. They were expelled from their school and banned from admission to any other school. One of the pupils, Ignacy Neufeld, subsequently shot himself; Modrzejewska attended his funeral.

Chłapowski
On September 12, 1868, Modjeska married a Polish nobleman, Karol Bożenta Chłapowski. Best known in America as "Count Bozenta," he was not a count. His family belonged to the untitled landed gentry (ziemiaństwo). In the United States he adopted the stage name "Count Bozenta" as a ploy to gain publicity. "Bozenta" was easier for an English-speaking audience to pronounce than "Chłapowski."

At the time of their marriage, Chłapowski was employed as the editor of a liberal nationalist newspaper, Kraj (The Country), which was owned by Adam Sapieha and a Mr. Sammelson. Modjeska wrote that their home "became the center of the artistic and literary world [of Kraków]." Poets, authors, politicians, artists, composers and other actors frequented Modjeska's salon.

Immigration

In July 1876, after spending more than a decade as the reigning diva of the Polish national theater, for reasons both personal and political, Modjeska and her husband chose to immigrate to the United States.

Once in America, Modjeska and her husband purchased a ranch near Anaheim, California. Julian Sypniewski, Łucjan Paprowski, and Henryk Sienkiewicz (winner of the Nobel Prize for literature in 1905), were among the friends who had accompanied them to California. It was during this period that Sienkiewicz wrote his Charcoal Sketches (Szkice węglem). Originally the artists Stanisław Witkiewicz (father of Stanisław Ignacy Witkiewicz) and Adam Chmielowski (the future St. Albert) were also to have come with Modjeska's group, but they changed their plans. She was a member of the Pacific Coast Women's Press Association.

Modjeska intended to abandon her career and envisioned herself living "a life of toil under the blue skies of California, among the hills, riding on horseback with a gun over my shoulder." The reality proved less cinematic. None of the colonists knew the first thing about ranching or farming, and they could barely speak English. The utopian experiment failed, the colonists went their separate ways, and Modjeska returned to the stage, reprising the Shakespearean roles that she had performed in Poland. Perhaps the best account of daily life on the ranch is Theodore Payne's memoir, Life on the Modjeska Ranch in the Gay Nineties.

American career

On 20 August 1877, Modjeska debuted at the California Theatre in San Francisco in an English version of Ernest Legouvé's Adrienne Lecouvreur. She was seen by theatrical agent Harry J. Sargent who signed her for a tour on the east coast where she made her New York debut. She then spent three years abroad (1879–82), mainly in London, attempting to improve her English, before returning to the stage in America. In 1880, she visited the Lizard Peninsula in Cornwall and on hearing that the parish church of Ruan Minor was in need of an organ she collaborated with Mr J Forbes-Robertson to put on a performance. Romeo and Juliet was performed on a temporary stage in the vicarage garden and watched by many local people. A resident of Penzance and soon-to-be member of parliament for the St Ives constituency, Charles Campbell Ross, played the part of Friar Laurence.

Despite her accent and imperfect command of English, she achieved great success. During her career, she played nine Shakespearean heroines, Marguerite Gautier in Camille, and Schiller's Maria Stuart. In 1883, the year she obtained American citizenship, she produced Henrik Ibsen's A Doll's House in Louisville, Kentucky, the first Ibsen play staged in the United States. In the 1880s and 1890s, she had a reputation as the leading female interpreter of Shakespeare on the American stage.

In 1893, Modjeska was invited to speak to a women's conference at the Chicago World's Fair, and described the situation of Polish women in the Russian and Prussian-ruled parts of dismembered Poland. This led to a tsarist ban on her traveling in Russian territory.

Modjeska suffered a stroke and was partially paralyzed in 1897, but recovered and soon returned to the stage, continuing to perform for several additional years.

During her last stay in Poland, from 31 October 1902 to 28 April 1903, she appeared on the stage in Lwów, Poznań, and her native Kraków.

On 2 May 1905, she gave a jubilee performance in New York City. Then she toured for two years and ended her acting career, afterward only appearing sporadically in support of charitable causes.

Modjeska died at Newport Beach, California on 8 April 1909, aged 68, from  Bright's disease. Her remains were sent to Kraków to be buried in the family plot at the Rakowicki Cemetery.

Her autobiography Memories and Impressions of Helena Modjeska was published posthumously in 1910. A Polish translation ran the same year in the Kraków newspaper Czas (Time). The last Polish edition of the book appeared in 1957.

Modrzejewska's son, Rudolf Modrzejewski (Ralph Modjeski), was a civil engineer who gained fame as a designer of bridges.

Legacies

Arden, Modjeska's home from 1888 to 1906, is a registered National Historic Landmark.

Named for her are:
 Modjeska Park in Anaheim, California (33°48'53"N   117°57'8"W)
 Helene Street in Anaheim, California
 Modjeska Canyon, California (where Arden is located)
 Modjeska Falls, California, at the Glen Alpine Springs Resort
 Modjeska Peak (the north peak of Saddleback Mountain).
 Bouquet Helena Modjeska by American perfumer John Blocki of Prussian and Polish descent
 Modjeskas, a caramel-covered marshmallow confection invented in 1889 by a local candy-maker named Anton Busath (and later made by other candy-makers, including Bauer's Candies, Muth's Candies and Schimpff's Confectionery) in her honor when she visited Louisville, Kentucky.
 A street in Wrocław, formerly named after the German actress Agnes Sorma when the city was part of Germany as Breslau.
 Modjeska Youth Theater Company in Milwaukee, Wisconsin
 A Pullman car, the Helena Modjeska, was named for her.
 SS Helena Modjeska, a 7,000 ton US cargo steamer that ran aground on Goodwin Sands in 1946.

A statue of Modjeska is located outside the Pearson Park Amphitheater in Anaheim, California.

Modjeska was the mother of bridge engineer Ralph Modjeski and godmother to artist-author-philosopher Stanisław Ignacy Witkiewicz (son of artist Stanisław Witkiewicz, who almost accompanied Modjeska and her family to California in 1876). She was also the aunt of artist Władysław T. Benda.

She was godmother to American actress Ethel Barrymore.

Roles

Modjeska's chief tragic roles were:
 William Shakespeare:
 Ophelia in Hamlet
 Juliet in Romeo and Juliet
 Desdemona in Othello
 Queen Anne in Richard III
 Nora in Henrik Ibsen's A Doll's House
 Luisa Miller in Salvadore Cammarano's Luisa Miller
 Friedrich Schiller's Maria Stuart and Princess Eboli
 Marion Delorme in Victor Hugo's Marion Delorme
 Victor Hugo's Tisbé
 Juliusz Słowacki's Maria Stuart and Mazeppa

Modrzejewska was also the Polish interpreter of the more prominent plays by Ernest Legouvé, Alexandre Dumas, père and fils, Émile Augier, Alfred de Musset, Octave Feuillet and Victorien Sardou.

In literature
Susan Sontag's award-winning 1999 novel In America, though fiction, is based on Modjeska's life. The book precipitated a controversy when Sontag was accused of having plagiarized other works about Modjeska.

Modjeska was a character in the novella My Mortal Enemy by Willa Cather.

Scholars Joanna and Catharina Polatynska have posited that Modjeska might have been Arthur Conan Doyle's model for the character Irene Adler, the only woman that Sherlock Holmes came close to loving. In "A Scandal in Bohemia", Doyle mentions Adler having been prima donna of the fictional Imperial Opera of Warsaw in the same years when Modjeska was at the peak of her theatrical career in Warsaw, and the fictional character's personality recalls that of the actual actress.

Death anniversary
In 2009, in honor of the 100th anniversary of her death, the Historical Museum of the City of Kraków presented the exhibition "Helena Modjeska (1840–1909): For the Love of Art" (8 April – 20 September 2009). The Warsaw staging of the same exhibition ran from October 2009 through January 2010. The exhibition included items from the Bowers Museum in Santa Ana, California.

Google Doodle
To commemorate the 181st anniversary of her birth on 12 October 2021, a Google Doodle paid homage to Modjeska.

See also
Helena Modrzejewska National Stary Theater in Kraków
Legitimacy
List of Poles
Modjeska House
Starring Madame Modjeska

Notes

References

Further reading

External links

Archival collections
 
Guide to the Ellen K. Lee Collection on Helena Modjeska and Orange County. Special Collections and Archives, The UC Irvine Libraries, Irvine, California.
Guide to the Collection of Helena Modjeska Theater Memorabilia. Special Collections and Archives, The UC Irvine Libraries, Irvine, California.
Guide to the Helena Modjeska Collection. Special Collections and Archives, The UC Irvine Libraries, Irvine, California.
Madam Modjeska scrapbooks, 1877–1898, held by the Billy Rose Theatre Division, New York Public Library for the Performing Arts
Heroines of the Modern Stage p. 52 by Forrest Izard c. 1915

Other
 Helena Modrzejewska at culture.pl
 Modjeska, Helena at American National Biography
 Diogenes Club. Theaters in Warsaw, Where Irene Adler Sang
 A play in which Modjeska reflects on her life
 A documentary film about Helena Modjeska's life and passions
 Helena Modjeska – Icon of Style. Reconstructions of XIX century costumes
 

1840 births
1909 deaths
19th-century American actresses
19th-century Polish actresses
Actors from Orange County, California
Actresses from Kraków
American stage actresses
Burials at Rakowicki Cemetery
History of Orange County, California
People from Los Angeles County, California
Polish emigrants to the United States
Polish stage actresses
Polish salon-holders
Pacific Coast Women's Press Association